Sajar Al-Shammeri (born 1 July 1992) is a Saudi Arabian professional footballer who plays as a forward for Al-Jandal.

Career
Al-Shammeri started his career at the youth team of Al-Jandal and represented the club at every level. On 5 March 2013, joined to Al-Qala on loan from Al-Jandal. On 1 August 2017, Al-Shammeri joined Al-Taqadom, On 26 August 2018, Al-Shammeri return to Al-Jandal. On 23 January 2020, Al-Shammeri joined Al-Ain,  Al-Shammeri achieved promotion with Al-Ain to the Pro League for the first time in the club's history. On 20 August 2022, Al-Shammeri joined Al-Jandal.

References

External links
 

1992 births
Living people
Saudi Arabian footballers
Association football forwards
Al Jandal Club players
Al-Qala Club players
Al-Taqadom FC players
Al-Ain FC (Saudi Arabia) players
Al-Diriyah Club players
Saudi Fourth Division players
Saudi Second Division players
Saudi First Division League players
Saudi Professional League players